The Encyclopaedia Islamica is an encyclopedia on Islamic  and Iranian studies published by Brill, comprising a projected 16-volume translation of selected articles from the new Persian Dā'erat-ol-Ma'āref-e Bozorg-e Eslāmi ("The Great Islamic Encyclopaedia"), supplemented by additional articles written in English by scholars affiliated with the Institute of Ismaili Studies.

The Persian-language project has been led by Kazem Mousavi-Bojnourdi since 1983, when the Center for the Great Islamic Encyclopedia was established in Teheran for the purpose of constituting a scientific committee to oversee its creation. The project, which provides comprehensive coverage of Shia Islam has sparked considerable interest in the Islamic world and is being consulted by many Persian-speaking scholars of Islamic studies. As of 2016, the encyclopedia is at the ninth letter of the Persian alphabet and its 22nd completed volume.

Brill's Encyclopaedia Islamica, which is edited by Farhad Daftary and Wilferd Madelung, is currently at its fifth volume.  It was begun in 2008 and is expected to be completed in 2023. It is intended for advanced graduate students and scholars who require meticulous documentation.

See also 
 Center for the Great Islamic Encyclopedia
 The Comprehensive History of Iran
 Iran Between Two Revolutions
 Foucault in Iran: Islamic Revolution after the Enlightenment

References

External links
 Official Persian text of the first 24 volumes official website
 The official announcement at Brill Publication with a preview
 Translation by The Institute of Ismaili Studies

Encyclopedias of Islam
Persian encyclopedias
English-language encyclopedias
Iranian online encyclopedias
Iranian books
21st-century encyclopedias